Radamel is a given name. Notable people with the name include:

Radamel Falcao (born 1986), Colombian footballer
Radamel García (1957–2019), Colombian footballer, Falcao's father

See also
Radames